ERB-79 is a synthetic estrogen and a selective agonist of the ERβ. It is a racemic mixture, with the active enantiomer being ERB-26. ERB-79 shows more than 484-fold selectivity for transactivation of the ERβ over the ERα. Its EC50 value for the ERβ is 0.448 nM (14.52% of the potency of estradiol) and for the ERα is 79 nM (0.03% of the potency of estradiol). It has no antagonistic activity at either receptor. ERB-79 is active in preclinical models of arthritis. The chemical structure of ERB-79 does not appear to have been disclosed.

See also
 Diarylpropionitrile
 ERB-196
 Erteberel
 FERb 033
 Prinaberel (ERB-041)
 WAY-166818
 WAY-200070
 WAY-214156

References

Drugs with undisclosed chemical structures
Selective ERβ agonists
Synthetic estrogens